Shellback Wilderness is a  wilderness area in western White Pine County, in the U.S. state of Nevada.  The Wilderness lies within the Humboldt-Toiyabe National Forest and is therefore administered by the U.S. Forest Service.

Located just north of the Bald Mountain and White Pine Range Wilderness Areas, the Shellback Wilderness was created by the White Pine County Conservation, Recreation and Development Act of 2006. The western slope of the Wilderness contains several springs and lush vegetation, whereas the eastern slope is much more arid.

See also
List of wilderness areas in Nevada
List of U.S. Wilderness Areas
Wilderness Act

References

External links
SHellback Wilderness - Humboldt-Toiyabe National Forest
Shellback Wilderness map - Humboldt-Toiyabe National Forest
Shellback Wilderness - Friends of Nevada Wilderness
"Scientists Voice Their Overwhelming Support for Wilderness Designations in White Pine County, Nevada" by the Wilderness Society

Wilderness areas of Nevada
Protected areas of White Pine County, Nevada
Humboldt–Toiyabe National Forest